Allobates nidicola is a species of frog in the family Aromobatidae.
It is endemic to Brazil.
Its natural habitat is tropical moist lowland forest. It is phenotypically similar to Allobates masniger, and the two species share an allopatric distribution along the Madeira River.

References

nidicola
Endemic fauna of Brazil
Amphibians of Brazil
Taxonomy articles created by Polbot
Amphibians described in 2003